WJHL-TV (channel 11) is a television station licensed to Johnson City, Tennessee, United States, serving the Tri-Cities area as an affiliate of CBS and ABC. The station is owned by Nexstar Media Group, and maintains studios on East Main Street in downtown Johnson City; its transmitter is located on Holston Mountain in the Cherokee National Forest.

History
WJHL-TV began broadcasting on October 26, 1953. It was owned by Hanes Lancaster, Sr. his son Hanes, Jr. and Jesse W. "Jay" Birdwell along with WJHL radio (910 AM, now WJCW; and FM 101.5, now WQUT).

The call letters stood for John H. Lancaster, Hanes, Sr.'s father and Hanes, Jr.'s grandfather, who had founded the AM station in 1938. Hanes, Jr., who was the radio station's sales manager, was intrigued by the potential of television, and pushed hard for building a television counterpart to WJHL radio. Hanes, Sr. was skeptical, but Hanes, Jr. lined up enough potential investors to persuade his father to take the project under his wing.

The Lancaster-Birdwell interests applied for a license in 1948, only to be derailed by the nationwide license freeze that had been imposed a few months earlier. After a four-and-a-half year wait, they were granted a license in January 1953.

In the summer of 1953, WJHL-TV was on track to be the first television station to sign on in East Tennessee, projecting to begin operations on October 17. At the time, the station's original transmission tower was being constructed on Tannery Knob in downtown Johnson City. With just a few weeks before sign-on, the guy wires snapped, sending the  tower and its antenna crashing to the ground, falling just  from the transmission equipment. Despite the damage, only two people were injured. This enabled WROL-TV in Knoxville (now WATE-TV) to beat WJHL-TV to the air by almost a month. Since many advertisers and banks were already skeptical about television's viability (the tower crash did not help), the Lancasters had to scramble for funding. They were able to get the station on the air more than a week later, but had to side-mount a much smaller replacement antenna on a wooden power pole the Johnson City Power Board installed at the last minute.

In 1955, Birdwell sold his interests in WJHL-AM-FM-TV, ending his involvement in broadcasting. Birdwell had already sold WBIR in Knoxville (now WIFA) eleven years earlier to a Cincinnati-based consortium, which retained the call letters Birdwell initiated, reflecting the first three letters of his name. In 1956, that same consortium launched WBIR-TV, which retains Birdwell's original call letters to this day.

Originally, WJHL-TV was affiliated with all four television networks of the time—CBS, NBC, ABC, and DuMont. However, its primary affiliation has always been with CBS, due to that network's long-time affiliation with WJHL radio. In 1954, the WJHL-TV transmitter was relocated to Buffalo Mountain southwest of Johnson City, which is  higher than Tannery Knob. From that location, the station was able to better reach Bristol, Kingsport and other areas of Eastern Tennessee, Southwestern Virginia, and Western North Carolina. Meanwhile, NBC moved to WCYB-TV in Bristol when that station signed on in 1956. WJHL lost Dumont soon afterward when that network shut down. WJHL and WCYB shared ABC until 1969 when WKPT-TV in Kingsport signed on and became the market's ABC affiliate.

The Lancasters sold off their radio interests in 1960, and in turn sold WJHL-TV to Roy H. Park Broadcasting in 1964—earning a handsome return on John H. Lancaster's original investment from 26 years earlier. Around this time, the station adopted a logo featuring a U.S. highway sign with an "11" inside it, which remained in use until around 1987. The logo was already well known in the area, since alternate routes of US 11, US 11E and 11W, pass through most of the major cities and towns in the Tri-Cities. The shields were, and still are, quite prevalent in the area and became an instant promotional link for the station. Park Broadcasting was renamed Park Communications in the 1970s.

Hanes Lancaster, Jr. succeeded his father as station manager in 1954, and remained as station manager after the sale to Park. In 1989, Lancaster, Jr. was succeeded by Jack Dempsey, who held the post until June 2012, when he went to WCYB. Dan Cates was appointed General Manager of WJHL in August 2012, after being the news director of sister station WSPA-TV in Spartanburg, South Carolina. Many of its employees have stayed on for thirty years or more, which is unusual for such a small market (it is currently the 93rd market, the smallest in the state with three full big three affiliates).

In 1969, WJHL moved its transmitter once again  higher and further east, this time side by side with WKPT on the lower end of Holston High Point on Holston Mountain. To this day, WQUT-FM (the former WJHL-FM) still broadcasts from WJHL-TV's old tower on Buffalo Mountain.

Media General acquired Park Communications and WJHL in 1997 and dropped its longtime brand of "TV 11" in favor of "NewsChannel 11". The station began broadcasting a digital signal on UHF channel 58 in 1998. In May 2009, WJHL switched its branding from "NewsChannel 11" to "11 Connects." WJHL reverted to the NewsChannel 11 branding in October 2012.

Under federal must-carry rules, broadcasters can either allow cable systems in their market to carry their signals for free or charge a fee under retransmission consent provisions. On December 3, 2008, it was announced that Inter Mountain Cable (IMC), a cable provider serving parts of Eastern Kentucky, announced that it would drop WJHL from its lineup unless an agreement was reached over retransmission consent. According to The Mountain Eagle, this dispute has caused concern among officials in the city of Fleming-Neon where IMC holds the cable television franchise there. The city council in Fleming-Neon has stated that the removal of WJHL will violate IMC's franchise agreement.

WJHL-DT2
WJHL-DT2, branded on air as ABC Tri-Cities, is the ABC-affiliated second digital subchannel of WJHL-TV, broadcasting in high definition on channel 11.2.

WJHL-DT2 was established in late 2006 as a simulcast of its 24-hour cable weather channel. In August 2011, WJHL-DT2 established a general entertainment format as a MeTV affiliate.

On January 4, 2016, Media General and ABC announced that WJHL-DT2 would become the Tri-Cities' ABC affiliate on February 1 of that year, ending that network's affiliation in the Tri-Cities on WKPT-TV and MeTV's affiliation with WJHL-DT2. The move reunited the network with WJHL, which had a secondary affiliation with ABC until WKPT's launch in 1969. MeTV was promptly picked up by WKPT's sister station WAPK-CD, while that station's MyNetworkTV affiliation moved to WKPT.

Programming

WJHL-TV
In addition to the CBS network schedule, syndicated programming on WJHL-TV include Dr. Phil and Family Feud.

WJHL-DT2
Shortly after launching, WJHL-DT2 had to wait a year to carry the Saturday morning Litton's Weekend Adventure children's educational programming block designed mainly for carriage by ABC affiliates, as it was under a syndication contract and WKPT retained their rights to carry it after disaffiliating from ABC. It moved to WJHL-DT2 in April 2017, after WKPT voided all syndication contracts to carry Cozi TV, and to honor existing commitments to the former syndicated E/I programming WJHL-DT2 carried instead to fulfill their requirements.

Because of the 6:30 p.m. newscast, WJHL-DT2 has aired ABC World News Tonight at 7 p.m. unlike most ABC stations in the Eastern Time Zone.

In addition to the ABC network schedule, syndicated programming on WJHL-DT2 includes Access Hollywood, Judge Mathis and The People's Court, along with second runs of Dr. Phil and Family Feud.

News operation
WJHL's newscasts were simulcast on WKPT for four years. That station shut down its news department in February 2002. The simulcasts ceased in September 2006 (WKPT later restarted its own news operation, which itself shut down January 29, 2016). In late 2006, WJHL-TV launched a 24-hour cable weather channel. It was seen on most cable outlets in the area via digital cable and on digital channel 11.3; in 2015, the channel was replaced by Ion Television as a result of an affiliation deal between Media General and Ion. On August 11, 2008, Channel 11 debuted a new daytime show, Daytime Tri-Cities. The show is hosted by Morgan King (a former weatherman at WKPT and WCYB) and Amy Lynn (who was an anchor at WCYB). In the November 2008 ratings period, WJHL's 11 p.m. news took over the ratings lead from WCYB for the first time in thirty years.

On April 21, 2010, WJHL management announced that the station would convert Channel 11 newscasts to high definition. On October 4, 2010, WJHL became the second station in the Tri-Cities market to convert its newscast in high definition.

When WJHL-DT2 switched from MeTV to ABC on February 1, 2016, WJHL's morning, 11 p.m., and weekend newscasts began simulcasting on the subchannel. In addition, WJHL-DT2 airs newscasts at 6:30 p.m. and 7:30 p.m., with ABC World News Tonight broadcast in between the two local newscasts at 7 p.m. The newscasts are branded ABC Tri-Cities News and are exclusive to WJHL-DT2.

In addition to its Johnson City studios and newsroom, WJHL operates news bureaus in the Progress Building in downtown Kingsport, on State Street in Bristol, Tennessee, and on Depot Street in Greeneville, Tennessee.

Technical information

Subchannels
The station's digital signal is multiplexed:

Analog-to-digital conversion
WJHL-TV shut down its analog signal, over VHF channel 11, on June 12, 2009, the official date in which full-power television stations in the United States transitioned from analog to digital broadcasts under federal mandate. The station's digital signal relocated from its pre-transition UHF channel 58, which was among the high band UHF channels (52–69) that were removed from broadcasting use as a result of the transition, to its analog-era VHF channel 11.

Out-of-market cable carriage
In recent years, WJHL has been carried on cable in multiple areas outside of the Tri-Cities media market. That includes cable systems within the Knoxville market in Tennessee, and the Asheville and Charlotte markets in North Carolina.

References

External links

JHL-TV
CBS network affiliates
ABC network affiliates
Antenna TV affiliates
Johnson City, Tennessee
Television channels and stations established in 1953
Nexstar Media Group
1953 establishments in Tennessee